Duwamish is a retired fireboat in the United States. She is the second oldest vessel designed to fight fires in the US, after Edward M. Cotter, in Buffalo, New York.

Career
Duwamish was built in 1909 for the Seattle Fire Department in Richmond Beach, Washington, just north of Seattle. She was equipped with three American LaFrance steam piston pumps rated at a capacity of  each. She was originally designed to ram and sink burning wooden vessels, as a last resort, and was equipped with a ram bow for doing so.

On July 30, 1914, Duwamish was involved in fighting the fire on the Grand Trunk Pacific dock.  In the 1930s, as a cost-saving measure, the Seattle City Council directed that Duwamish be used as a tug to push the city's garbage scow.

This capacity was only exceeded in 2003 by the Los Angeles Fire Department's Warner Lawrence, which delivers .

Current status 
Retired in 1985, Duwamish was purchased by the Puget Sound Fireboat Foundation. She is permanently moored at the Historic Ships Wharf near the Museum of History & Industry at South Lake Union Park in Seattle. Visitors may board the vessel when volunteer staff is available.

Duwamish was declared a National Historic Landmark in 1989.

She is a city landmark.

See also
Historic preservation
Duwamish Native American tribe
Duwamish River
Sea Scouting (Boy Scouts of America)

References

External links

Biography of Eugene L. McAllaster, designer of Duwamish.

Fireboats in Seattle, Washington
Firefighting museums in the United States
Historic American Engineering Record in Washington (state)
Museum ships in Washington (state)
Museums in Seattle
National Register of Historic Places in Seattle
National Historic Landmarks in Washington (state)
Propeller-driven steamboats of Washington (state)
Ships on the National Register of Historic Places in Washington (state)
Steam tugs of Washington (state)
South Lake Union, Seattle